Heart on My Sleeve is the sophomore studio album by English singer and songwriter Ella Mai, released on 6 May 2022 through 10 Summers and Interscope Records. The album was executive-produced by Mustard and Meko Yohannes, and features guest appearances from Latto, Roddy Ricch, and Lucky Daye. It serves as the follow up to Mai's 2018 self-titled debut album.

A deluxe edition of the album featuring three additional songs was released on 2 February 2023 in conjunction with the announcement of Mai's Heart On My Sleeve North American tour.

Composition and themes 
In an interview with The Recording Academy Press writer Malik Peay, Ella Mai explained the meaning of the album and the creative process behind it:"I was so heavily invested and involved with the entire process. I knew what I wanted to say and what I wanted to sound like. [...] Every song, every session, it did kind of feel like a therapy session for me. I was wearing my heart on my sleeve in the studio, and just really explaining how I was feeling at the time. [...] I think the difficulty comes from wondering, is this too vulnerable? But actually, it was everything that was on my heart. [...] I think through creating this album, I realized how resilient I am, even if I'm in a situation that I haven't really experienced before. [...] I love to storytell, but I do understand sometimes that it doesn't always need to be there. [...] I think it's incredibly freeing."

Promotion 
"Not Another Love Song" was released as the lead single on 2 October 2020. Its music video was released on 20 October 2020. "DFMU" was released on 28 January 2022, as the second single, alongside a music video. "Leave You Alone" was released on 31 March 2022, as the third single. "How" featuring Roddy Ricch was sent to rhythmic contemporary radio on 7 June 2022, as the fourth single. Its music video was released on 28 July 2022. "This Is" from the deluxe edition was sent to rhythmic contemporary radio on 14 March 2023, as the fifth single.

Commercial performance 
Heart On My Sleeve debuted at number 15 on the US Billboard 200, number nine on the Top R&B/Hip-Hop Albums and number two on the Top R&B Albums chart, earning 20,000 album-equivalent units (15,000 being pure album sales) in its first week.

Track listing 
Adapted from the album liner notes.

Notes
• "Not Another Love Song" was originally released as a single in 2018; the version on the album is extended and features a spoken-word segment by American singer Mary J. Blige beginning at 3:32. "Sink or Swim" also features Blige beginning at 3:32.

• American singer Kirk Franklin and choir are featured on "Fallen Angel" beginning at 3:18.

Charts

Weekly charts

References 

2018 debut albums
Ella Mai albums
Albums produced by DJ Mustard
Interscope Records albums